Lishui District, formerly Lishui County until January 2013, is one of 11 districts of Nanjing, Jiangsu province, China.

The district is south-east of Jiangning District and north of Gaochun District. It is predominantly rural.

History 
 In 591, Lishui county was established.
 In 1295, the county was converted into a subprefecture.
 In 1369, it was restored as a county.
 In 1491, its south extremity was separated to establish Gaochun county.

Administrative divisions
In the present, Lishui District has 8 towns and 2 others.
8 Towns

2 Others
 Lishui Development Zone
 Lishui County Forestry

Climate

Culture
Luoshan dragon, a traditional dragon dance

Transportation
The Nanjing–Hangzhou Passenger Railway crosses Lishui District. As of 2015, about 30 trains a day make a stop at Lishui Station (46 km / 16 minutes away from Nanjing South Railway Station), which is located about five miles east of downtown Lishui.It was completed by the end of 2017 and opened to traffic in 2018. Mainly along S123 and Qinhuai Avenue. Stations include: Konggang New Town Jiangning Station, Zhetang Station, Konggang New Town Lishui Station, Qunli Station, Wolong Lake Station, Lishui Station, Zhongshan Lake Station, Xingzhuang Station and Wuxiangshan Station.

Speciality cuisine

Hong Lan Royal Pastry

References
www.xzqh.org 

County-level divisions of Jiangsu
Districts of Nanjing